Forest City Township may refer to the following townships in the United States:

 Forest City Township, Mason County, Illinois
 Forest City Township, Howard County, Iowa
 Forest City Township, Meeker County, Minnesota